Azam Jahi Mills (A.J. Mills) is a company established in Warangal district of the Kingdom of Hyderabad. Azam Jahi Mills was established by the 7th Nizam of Hyderabad Mir Osman Ali Khan in 1934 and is named after his 1st son - Prince Azam Jah.

History

The National Textile Corporation, of Bangalore had taken over the company in 1974. In 2008, the land was given to Kakatiya Urban Development Authority (KUDA) which re-sold it by making plots. Out of the 200 acres, the NTC now reportedly owns 30 acres on which it proposes to set up an Apparel Park in view of public demand.

It was functioning in full swing during the 1970s. It was a huge complex imparting to students the technologies of factories. Nearby was the ice factory run and owned by a Parsee gentleman.

References

Hyderabad State
Hanamkonda district
Companies based in Telangana
Defunct textile companies of India
Establishments in Hyderabad State
Indian companies established in 1934
Manufacturing companies established in 1974